FO&O is a Swedish pop boy band made up of Oscar Enestad, Omar Rudberg and Felix Sandman. Originally established in October 2013 under the name the Fooo, the group changed its name to the Fooo Conspiracy in September 2014. Founding member Oscar "Olly" Molander left the group in November 2016, and the group changed its name for a third time in February 2017, to FO&O.

Career

2013–2015: Off the Grid

In 2013, the band started out doing street performances in the streets of Stockholm while uploading the footage onto YouTube for their fans (called 'Foooers') to see. During 2013, the band made several television performances, at the gala Tillsammans för Världens Barn, and at the Idol 2013 finale in Globen. The band became known after Canadian singer Justin Bieber and his manager saw a video clip of the band on YouTube. Bieber's manager called the Fooo's management and asked if the band would want to become the opening act for Bieber's concert in Globen in April 2013 which the band accepted. The Fooo's first charting single was "Build a Girl", which reached number 41 on Sverigetopplistan, the official Swedish singles chart. The song also charted on Digilistanchart reaching number 3. The Fooo's first EP, the self-titled The Fooo, was released on 16 August 2013 by The Artist House. They won the Swedish Grammis award "Innovator of the Year". Their debut studio album Off the Grid topped the official Swedish Albums Chart in its first week of release on 2 April 2014. On 27 August 2014, they released their second extended play, Conspiration. The EP peaked at number 19 on the Swedish Albums Chart. They released their third extended play, Serenade in the United States on 30 October 2014. They released Coordinates as their fourth extended play on 7 January 2015. The EP peaked at number 33 on the Swedish Albums Chart. "Wild Hearts" was released as the lead single from the EP on 19 January 2015. They released the single "Run with Us" on 5 June 2015, followed by the single "Jimi Hendrix" on 4 December 2015.

2016–2017: Melodifestivalen and FO&O
On 29 January 2016, they released the single "My Girl". The song peaked at number 58 on the Swedish Singles Chart. It was followed by the single "Summer Love", released on 29 April 2016 and peaking at number 54 on the Swedish Singles Chart. They re-released "My Girl" on 17 June 2016, featuring vocals from Danny Saucedo. On 28 October 2016, they released the single "Who Doesn't Love Love". In November 2016, Oscar "Olly" Molander left the band. On 30 November 2016, the Fooo Conspiracy was announced as one of the 28 acts to compete in Melodifestivalen 2017 with the song "Gotta Thing About You", under the new name of FO&O. They qualified to "andra chansen" from the third semi-final and later qualified for the final, winning against De Vet Du's "Roadtrip". They placed eleventh in the final.

FO&O announced the release of their self-titled album on social media, including "Gotta Thing About You" and new single "So So Good".

In September 2017, after speculation in the Swedish press about the band's split, the band confirmed that they were on hiatus and were taking time to pursue solo projects.

Members

Current members
 Oscar Johan Ingvar Enestad, born , in Sköndal, Stockholm
 Felix Karl Wilhelm Sandman, born , in Värmdö, Stockholm County
 Omar Josúe Rudberg, born , in Venezuela (moved to Kungsbacka with his mother at six years of age)

Past members
 Oscar "Olly" Hans Olof Molander, born , in Lidingö, Stockholm County

Discography

Albums

Extended plays

Singles

References

Notes

References

Swedish boy bands
Swedish pop music groups
Musical groups established in 2013
English-language singers from Sweden
2013 establishments in Sweden
MTV Europe Music Award winners
Melodifestivalen contestants of 2017